The Creamery Covered Bridge is a historic covered bridge in West Brattleboro, Vermont.  Now closed to traffic, the Town lattice truss bridge formerly carried Guilford Road across Whetstone Brook, just south of Vermont Route 9.  Built in 1879, it is Brattleboro's last surviving 19th-century covered bridge.

Description and history
The bridge is topped by a roof that is slate over the roadway and metal over the sidewalk. The bridge trusses, built to the patented design of Ithiel Town, are protected by vertical board siding that rises about half their height, with a similar wall outside the sidewalk. Guy wires attached to the upstream side provide additional lateral support.

The bridge was built in 1879 out of spruce lumber, and the sidewalk was added about 1920.  It is the last of what were once a large number of covered bridges in Brattleboro, and is the only covered bridge visible from Route 9 anywhere along its length, making it a significant tourist attraction.  The bridge was closed to traffic in 2010.

See also
National Register of Historic Places listings in Windham County, Vermont
List of bridges on the National Register of Historic Places in Vermont
List of Vermont covered bridges

References

External links
 
 Creamery Bridge Brattleboro, Vermont

Covered bridges on the National Register of Historic Places in Vermont
Bridges completed in 1879
Covered bridges in Windham County, Vermont
Buildings and structures in Brattleboro, Vermont
National Register of Historic Places in Windham County, Vermont
Road bridges on the National Register of Historic Places in Vermont
Wooden bridges in Vermont
Lattice truss bridges in the United States
1879 establishments in Vermont